Goldson is an unincorporated community in Lane County, Oregon, United States on Oregon Route 36 near Bear Creek, about  from Cheshire. Goldson post office was established in 1891 and named for the first postmaster, J. M. Goldson. It ran until 1934.

As of 1990, there was no town center remaining at the site, but the Goldson Grange,  to the west, remains active.

References

Unincorporated communities in Lane County, Oregon
1891 establishments in Oregon
Populated places established in 1891
Unincorporated communities in Oregon